Juice are a British a cappella voice trio, specialising in vocals with an experimental edge. They have performed their works on BBC Radio 3 and Classic FM. They also perform widely across the United Kingdom.

The current members are:
 Kerry Andrew, alto
 Sarah Dacey, soprano
 Anna Snow, soprano

All are graduates of the University of York.

Awards
Independent Music Awards 2012: Songspin - Best Contemporary Classical Album

References

External links
Juice website

A cappella musical groups